Class 157 Strathclyde Sprinter was the designation applied to a range of diesel multiple unit trains of the Sprinter family which were planned for regional use in the United Kingdom, in particular with the Strathclyde Passenger Transport Executive. As well as the class number, British Rail reserved carriage numbers in the 526xx and 576xx series for these units.

As the privatisation of British Rail began, the intended use of the new trains in the Strathclyde area on a range of both existing and newly reopened routes was shelved, owing to the lack of funding available for the reopenings that had been specified by the local authorities. An additional issue was Hunslet's attempt to transfer its intellectual property rights over a number of its engineering designs to another company throughout 1994. 

In the end, the order for the new trains was cancelled and due to this the Strathclyde Passenger Transport Executive ended up procuring a batch of Class 170 diesel multiple units as replacements.

Notes

References

157
Abandoned trains of the United Kingdom